Mount Douglas is a striking pyramidal peak, 1,750 m, near the head of Fry Glacier, on the divide between the Fry and the Mawson Glaciers. The New Zealand Northern Survey Party of the Commonwealth Trans-Antarctic Expedition (1956–58) established a survey station on its summit in December 1957 which was named for Murray H. Douglas, a member of the party.

References

Mountains of Victoria Land
Scott Coast